The 1886 Cincinnati Red Stockings season was a season in American baseball. The Red Stockings finished in fifth place in the American Association, 27.5 games behind the St. Louis Browns.

Regular season 
Pop Corkhill had a breakout season, hitting .265 with five home runs and a team high 97 RBI, while Bid McPhee hit .268 with a team highs in home runs with eight, stolen bases with 40, and runs with 139.  Fred Lewis had a team high .318 batting average.

On the mound, Mullane was the ace of the staff, as he had a 33–27 record with a 3.70 ERA in 56 starts, as he struck out 250 batters in 529.2 innings pitched.

Season summary 
The Red Stockings were coming off a second-place finish in the 1885 season, which was their highest placing since winning the 1882 American Association pennant.  Cincinnati was relatively quiet during the off-season; however, Tony Mullane, who had been suspended for the 1885 season for defying his contract, returned and made his Cincinnati debut in 1886.

The Red Stockings started the season off slowly, winning only four of their first twelve games to sit in seventh place.  Cincinnati would continue to play mediocre baseball, and would be in eighth place with a 24–35 record, 12.5 games out of first place.  The Red Stockings then went on a seven-game winning streak to climb into sixth place to bring their record to 31–35, however, they remained 12.5 games out of first.  The team eventually broke over the .500 level, reaching a season best three games over .500 with a 50–47 record. However, Cincinnati faded down the stretch, and finished with a losing record for the first time in team history, as they were 65–73, which was good for fifth place 27.5 games behind the St. Louis Browns.

Season standings

Record vs. opponents

Roster

Player stats

Batting

Starters by position 
Note: Pos = Position; G = Games played; AB = At bats; H = Hits; Avg. = Batting average; HR = Home runs; RBI = Runs batted in

Other batters 
Note: G = Games played; AB = At bats; H = Hits; Avg. = Batting average; HR = Home runs; RBI = Runs batted in

Pitching

Starting pitchers 
Note: G = Games pitched; IP = Innings pitched; W = Wins; L = Losses; ERA = Earned run average; SO = Strikeouts

Other pitchers 
Note: G = Games pitched; IP = Innings pitched; W = Wins; L = Losses; ERA = Earned run average; SO = Strikeouts

Relief pitchers 
Note: G = Games pitched; W = Wins; L = Losses; SV = Saves; ERA = Earned run average; SO = Strikeouts

References

External links
1886 Cincinnati Red Stockings season at Baseball Reference

Cincinnati Reds seasons
Cincinnati Red Stockings season
Cincinnati Reds